The 17th Arkansas Infantry Regiment was the designation of two units of the Confederate Army during the American Civil War. They were :

 17th Arkansas Infantry Regiment (Lemoyne's), formed August 1861, finished at Vicksburg July 1863
 17th (Griffith's) Arkansas Infantry Regiment, formed as Rector's Regt. in November 1861. Became Griffith's Regt in March 1862. Was consolidated into 11th/17th Mounted Infantry, March 1863

Military units and formations disambiguation pages